Raynor Scheine (born Raynor Johnston; January 19, 1942) is an American actor who has appeared in films for three decades dating back to 1979, including My Cousin Vinny and Fried Green Tomatoes.  His name is a play on the phrase "rain or shine". Raised in Emporia, VA, he received a degree at Virginia Commonwealth University.

Broadway performances
 Joe Turner's Come and Gone  (Mar 27, 1988 – June 26, 1988) – Rutherford Selig
 Gem of the Ocean (December 6, 2004 – February 6, 2005) – Rutherford Selig
 Inherit the Wind (Present) – Elijah

Filmography

Movie roles 

 Something Short of Paradise (1979) .... Professor
 Bloodrage (1979) .... Fred
 A Stranger is Watching (1982) .... Derelict
 Lovesick (1983) .... Shelter
 Touched (1983) .... Mitchell
 Nothing Lasts Forever (1984) .... Hillbilly
 Insignificance (1985) .... Autograph Hunter
 Nine 1/2 Weeks (1986) .... Pizza Delivery Boy
 No Mercy (1986) .... Curtis
 Stars and Bars (1988) .... Drunk
 Funny Farm (1988) .... Oates
 Lip Service (1988, TV Movie) .... Walter the 'Weather Moose'
 Johnny Handsome (1989) .... Gun dealer
 Ghost Dad (1990) .... Curtis Burch, the Cabbie
 The Naked Gun 2½: The Smell of Fear (1991) .... Explosion Thug #1
 Fried Green Tomatoes (1991) .... Sheriff Curtis Smoote
 My Cousin Vinny (1992) .... Ernie Crane
 The Real McCoy (1993) .... Baker
 Ace Ventura: Pet Detective (1994) .... Woodstock
 The War (1994) .... Mr. Lipnicki
 The Fence (1994) .... Jesse
 The Quick and the Dead (1995) .... Ratsy
 Killer: A Journal of Murder (1996) .... Trusty
 First Kid (1996) .... Maintenance Worker
 Last Man Standing (1996) .... Gas Station Attendant
 Extreme Measures (1996) .... Half-Mole
 Gone Fishin' (1997) .... Glenn
 Montana (1998) .... Fuller
 Joe the King (1999) .... Doctor
 Book of Shadows: Blair Witch 2 (2000) .... Rustin Parr
 Reveille (2001, Short) .... The Dude
 The Jimmy Show (2001) .... Pharmacist
 The Rookie (2002) .... Frank
 Season of the Hunted (2003) .... Roy
 Transamerica (2005) .... Bobby Jensen
 The New World (2005) .... Raynor
 The Sentinel (2006) .... Walter Xavier
 Man of the Year (2006) .... Mechanic
 Sugar Creek (2007) .... Frank Killings
 Magic (2010) .... Transient
 Zenith (2010) .... Dale
 Lincoln (2012) .... Josiah S. 'Beanpole' Burton

TV roles
 The Cosby Show – "Denise Kendall: Babysitter" (1989) .... Bob
 L.A. Law – "Love in Bloom" (1992) .... Lenny Varnes
 The West Wing – "In Excelsis Deo" (1999) .... Homeless Man
 Sliders – "Slidecage", "Way Out West" (1999) .... Koitar
 Third Watch – "Spring Forward, Fall Back" (2000) .... Fitz
 The Jimmy Show (2001) .... Pharmacist
 ER – "Freefall" (2003) .... Mr. Garland
 The District – "A House Divided" (2003) .... William 'Boots' Burke
 Deadwood – "Deadwood" (2004)
 Law & Order: Criminal Intent – "Silencer" (2007) .... Antonio
 A Stranger's Heart (2007) .... Frank

Video game roles
 Dark Reign: The Future of War (1997) (VG) (voice)
 Medal of Honor: Frontline (2002) (VG) (voice) .... Additional Voices
 Grand Theft Auto: San Andreas (2004) (VG) (voice) .... Pedestrian
 Red Dead Revolver (2004) (VG) (voice) .... Blind Willie Wilson / Cowboys #10
 BioShock (2007) (VG) (voice)

External links
 
 20th Anniversary of My Cousin Vinny Interview at Abnormal Use

1942 births
Living people
American male film actors
American male stage actors
American male television actors
People from Emporia, Virginia
Male actors from Virginia